The 2015 FAM Women's Football Championship, is the third season of the FAM Women's Football Championship. The competition will begin on 24 May 2015.

Participation
The Football Association of Maldives announced the chances to participate in the 2015 Women's Championship on 15 April 2015. The due date to participate in the competition is 14:30 (UTC+05:00), 30 April 2015.

References

External links
 Women's Championship at Haveeru Online

FAM Women's Football Championship
Women
2015 in women's association football